Hermannjahnite is a rare sulfate mineral with the relatively simple formula CuZn(SO4)2. It is one of many fumarolic minerals discovered on the Tolbachik volcano.

Relation to other minerals
Hermannjahnite is a zinc-analogue of dravertite - another mineral from prolific Tolbachik. Minerals somewhat chemically similar to hermannjahnite include ktenasite and christelite.

External links
 Hermannjahnite on Mindat:

References

Sulfate minerals
Copper(II) minerals
Zinc minerals
Monoclinic minerals
Minerals in space group 14
Minerals described in 2017